Arboa integrifolia is a shrub or tree with yellow flowers that grows in the dry tropics of Madagascar. A. integrifolia was previously classified as Erblichia integrifolia, Paropsia integrifolia, Piriqueta integrifolia, and Piriqueta mandrarensis, however, phylogenetic analysis supports the its classification as Arboa.

References 

Passifloraceae